The 2019–20 Dallas Stars season was the 53rd season for the National Hockey League franchise that was established on June 5, 1967, and 27th season since the franchise relocated from Minnesota prior to the start of the 1993–94 NHL season. The Stars advanced to the playoffs for consecutive seasons for the first time since 2007–08.

On December 10, 2019, Jim Montgomery was dismissed and replaced by Rick Bowness.

The season was suspended by the league officials on March 12, 2020, after several other professional and collegiate sports organizations followed suit as a result of the ongoing COVID-19 pandemic. On May 26, the NHL regular season was officially declared over with the remaining games being cancelled. The NHL officially resumed play in two controlled locations in August 2020, with Western Conference teams, including Dallas, playing in Edmonton and Eastern Conference teams in Toronto.  The Stars advanced to the playoffs and played in a round-robin tournament, which determined the team's seed for the playoffs; Dallas was ultimately seeded third, entering them into a first-round series against the Calgary Flames, which they won in six games. The Stars then faced the Colorado Avalanche in the second round, defeating them in seven games. In the Western Conference Final, the Stars defeated the Vegas Golden Knights in five games to advance to the Stanley Cup Finals for the first time in 20 years. They were ultimately defeated in six games by the Tampa Bay Lightning.

Standings

Divisional standings

Western Conference

Tiebreaking procedures
 Fewer number of games played (only used during regular season).
 Greater number of regulation wins (denoted by RW).
 Greater number of wins in regulation and overtime (excluding shootout wins; denoted by ROW).
 Greater number of total wins (including shootouts).
 Greater number of points earned in head-to-head play; if teams played an uneven number of head-to-head games, the result of the first game on the home ice of the team with the extra home game is discarded.
 Greater goal differential (difference between goals for and goals against).
 Greater number of goals scored (denoted by GF).

Schedule and results

Preseason
The pre-season schedule was published on June 13, 2019.

Regular season
The NHL regular season schedule was released on June 25, 2019. The Stars hosted the 2020 NHL Winter Classic against the Nashville Predators, the first outdoor game for both teams, winning by a final score of 4–2.

Playoffs 

The Stars played in a round-robin tournament to determine their seed in the Western conference. Dallas finished with a 1–2–0 record, earning the third seed in the conference.

The Stars defeated the Calgary Flames in the first round in six games.

In the second round, the Stars faced the Colorado Avalanche, defeating them in seven games.

The Stars faced the Vegas Golden Knights in the Conference Final, and defeated them in five games.

The Stars faced the Tampa Bay Lightning in the Stanley Cup Finals, where they were defeated in six games.

Player statistics

Skaters

Goaltenders

†Denotes player spent time with another team before joining the Stars. Stats reflect time with the Stars only.
‡Denotes player was traded mid-season. Stats reflect time with the Stars only.
Bold/italics denotes franchise record.

Transactions
The Stars have been involved in the following transactions during the 2019–20 season.

Trades

Free agents

Waivers

Contract terminations

Retirement

Signings

Draft picks

Below are the Dallas Stars' selections at the 2019 NHL Entry Draft, which was held on June 21 and 22, 2019, at Rogers Arena in Vancouver, British Columbia.

References

Dallas Stars seasons
Dallas Stars
Dallas Stars
Dallas Stars
2010s in Dallas
2019 in Texas
2020 in Texas
2020s in Dallas
Western Conference (NHL) championship seasons
Dallas